İlker Kaan Kaleli (born 11 May 1984) is a Turkish actor best known for his role in Poyraz Karayel.

Life and career
His mother is daughter of German mother and Turkish father who a scientist graduated from Heidelberg University. His father is a Turkish citizen of Kurdish descent from Van. Kaleli graduated from Istanbul Kültür University, Department of Art Management. He studied acting in London Academy of Music and Dramatic Art (LAMDA) acting school. He also received acting lessons in the studio collectors of Şahika Tekand.

He played in popular series Son, Kayıp Şehir and Kayıp respectively. In 2014, he appeared in the film Silsile. From 2015 to 2017, Kaleli played the leading character in Poyraz Karayel, for which he received a Golden Butterfly Award as best actor in 2016.

Filmography

Film

Web series

Tv Series

Awards and nominations

TV survey achievements and nominations

References

External links

1984 births
Living people
Turkish male television actors
Golden Butterfly Award winners
German people of Turkish descent